Al-Entesar Club  is a Saudi Arabian football team in Rabigh City playing at the Saudi Second Division.

Current squad 
As of Saudi Second Division:

Notable players
Abdoh Bernaoy

References

Entesar
1976 establishments in Saudi Arabia
Association football clubs established in 1976
Football clubs in Rabigh